Checkmate is a short drama film written by Eugenia Caruso and directed by Jason Bradbury. The film was executively produced by Susanna Cappellaro and Amy Gilliam and produced by Tim Mogridge and Giles Maunsell. Alexander Shulgin, who composed the score, also co-produced the film. The costumes, curated by stylist Davey Sutton, are by Ulyana Sergeenko and the archive of Ann Demeulemeester.

Plot 

Prosperity is trapped. In her constant pursuit of perfection she must battle her opposite Penury, in an enchanted game of chess. The game affects the lives of two perfect archetypal lovers in a far away land, but as the game develops and the end draws ever closer, we are confronted with the question; Can perfection last more than just a moment? In her parochial desire to win, Prosperity forsakes herself to remain trapped in the enchanted game.

Shooting Locations 
The film was shot entirely in North Wales. Locations include Dolbadarn Castle, Baron Hill Mansion and  Snowdonia National Park.

Cast 
 Ornella Muti as Penury 
 Siân Phillips as Prosperity 
 Susanna Cappellaro as Irina
 Lachlan Nieboer as Dimitri
 Eugenia Caruso as Fate

References

External links

British short films